Bangladesh Vision 2041 (Vision '41) is a national strategic plan to farther develop the socio-economic standing of the Peoples Republic of Bangladesh, issued by Prime Minister Sheikh Hasina and formulated by National Economic Council. As a part of four 5-year perspective plan to be undertaken between 2022 and 2041, Bangladesh is aiming to achieve high income status through industrialization. The initiative encourages expansion of manufacturing capacity and investment in human capital development to develop exports from Bangladesh.

Selected goals 
 Per capita income of $12,500 (more than $16,000 in 2041 prices)
 Maintain 9% GDP growth until 2031.
 Increase investment/GDP ratio to 46.9%
 Increasing tax revenue to 15% of GDP.
 Export diversification.
 Increase exports earnings to $300 billion.
 Increase life expectancy to 80 years.
 Extend universal health care to 75% of the population.
 Increase adult literacy rate to 100% by 2031.
 Free education for up to 12 years.

Projections

See also
 List of megaprojects in Bangladesh

References

Economy of Bangladesh
Bangladesh articles needing attention